"This Christmas"  is a song recorded by South Korean singer Taeyeon. It was released as a digital single on December 12, 2017, by SM Entertainment. It is the title track of Taeyeon's special Christmas album This Christmas: Winter Is Coming.

Background and release 
The music video for "This Christmas" was released on December 12, 2017. The younger version of Taeyeon in the video is played by Kim Jiwon, who made her debut as Liz of IVE in 2021, but was not a trainee at the time. To promote the album, Taeyeon held a two-night concert titled "The Magic of Christmas Time" on December 22 and 23, 2017 at Kyung Hee University, Seoul.

Chart performance
"This Christmas" debuted at number 2 on the South Korean Gaon Digital Chart.

Charts

Sales

Release history

Awards and nominations

References 

2017 singles
2017 songs
Christmas songs
SM Entertainment singles
Korean-language songs
Taeyeon songs